Giannis Firinidis (born 1 July 1983) is a Greek professional footballer who plays as a goalkeeper for Cypriot club Ermis Aradippou.

Career
On 27 July 2019, it was confirmed that Firinidis had joined Thyella Sarakinon.

References

External links
 AEL 1964 FC Official
 Profile at Sportlarissa.gr
 Profile at Mysports.gr

1983 births
Living people
Greek footballers
Greek expatriate footballers
Agrotikos Asteras F.C. players
Levadiakos F.C. players
Anagennisi Arta F.C. players
Preveza F.C. players
Pyrsos Grevena F.C. players
Aetos Skydra F.C. players
Anagennisi Epanomi F.C. players
Iraklis Thessaloniki F.C. players
Athlitiki Enosi Larissa F.C. players
PAS Lamia 1964 players
Kavala F.C. players
Pierikos F.C. players
Apollon Larissa F.C. players
Ermis Aradippou FC players
Cypriot First Division players
Association football goalkeepers
Greek expatriate sportspeople in Cyprus
Expatriate footballers in Cyprus
Footballers from Katerini